is a 2007 Japanese CGI anime film, written, directed, and edited by Fumihiko Sori, and features the voices of Meisa Kuroki, Yasuko Matsuyuki, and Shosuke Tanihara.

At the 60th Locarno International Film Festival, where Vexille made its world premiere, the film was sold to 75 countries, including the United States-based distributor, Funimation Entertainment; however since that time the number increased to 129 countries.

Plot
By the 2060s, robotics technology has become extremely advanced, including cybernetics. World opinion begins to turn against robotics, leading to the U.N. declaring a unilateral ban on further research in 2067. Japan, being home to robotics pioneer Daiwa Heavy Industries, strongly protests this ban, but is unable to prevent its passage. In protest, Japan withdraws from international politics. All foreigners are deported, and further immigration is prohibited. In addition, the R.A.C.E. network is constructed — 270 off-shore installations that cover Japan with an energy field, nullifying all communication with the outside world and making satellite surveillance impossible. Trade and diplomacy continues, but Japan vanishes from the world scene.

Ten years later, the United States Navy special warfare unit "SWORD" is trying to trap a Japanese informant for Daiwa in Colorado. The instigator, Saito, escapes by cutting off his own leg. Analysis shows the leg is made of bio-metal. SWORD suspects that Japan has concealed extensive development of banned technologies. They embark on an unapproved scheme to infiltrate Japan and to find out the frequency of the R.A.C.E. network, enabling SWORD to gather intelligence on the country. Although the agents successfully enter Japan, they are detected by security forces before they can transmit their data. Vexille is the sole SWORD agent to evade capture, and only her lover Leon survives to be taken to Daiwa's headquarters. Vexille awakens to find Tokyo is now a shanty town ruled by Daiwa. A small resistance movement opposes the company, and uses Vexille's transmitter to successfully transmit the distortion frequency.

Maria, the head of the resistance, details the 10 years of secrecy while SWORD studies Japan in shocked horror — the islands are a lifeless wasteland. In 2067, an unknown disease struck Japan and was countered by an experimental vaccine. In actuality, the disease was created by Daiwa and the "vaccine" was used as an excuse for Daiwa to begin testing experimental nanotechnology. Every Japanese citizen was converted into a form of synthetic life. But there were unforeseen side effects; the conversion was imperfect, resulting in the infected humans losing their free will and becoming just lifelike machines. Some of the nanotech went amok, creating the "Jags", giant whirling constructs of semisentient metal that prowl the wilderness. The Jags destroyed all of Japan, save Tokyo which is protected by an inedible wall of ceramic.

The Resistance plans to draw the Jags along a service bridge to Daiwa's corporate headquarters, which now stands in the middle of Tokyo Bay. Vexille volunteers her assistance (and that of her flight-capable armor). However, though Vexille and Maria succeed in drawing the Jags to the end of the service bridge, the bridge has been detached from the headquarters, the Jags fall into the sea, and Vexille and Maria are captured. They are taken to Kisaragi, the master of Daiwa, who boasts that his research is nearly complete. And as he needs more test subjects, he is going to invade America. Vexille attacks him with a hidden knife, revealing that his blood is still human — he has not used the process himself. Saito then strangles him. The town council forces the ceramic gates open, destroying Tokyo and enabling the Jags to enter Daiwa's headquarters. Kisaragi, having somehow survived, shoots Saito and escapes with his research. The underling then releases Vexille and Maria before succumbing to his wounds.

Vexille pursues Kisaragi while Maria frees Leon, who shows concern for Vexille, angering Maria. Thus when Vexille prevents Kisaragi's escape in a helicopter, Maria grabs him and holds them together as a Jag devours them. Vexille and Leon are rescued by a SWORD helicopter just as Daiwa headquarters collapses into the bay, along with every Jag in Japan. As Vexille and Leon are flown from a now completely lifeless Japan, Vexille comments that humanity's spirit can never be taken away.

Cast
Japanese
Meisa Kuroki as Lt. Cdr. Vexille Serra
Shosuke Tanihara as Cdr. Leon Fayden
Yasuko Matsuyuki as Maria
Takaya Kuroda as Zack
Akio Ōtsuka as Saito
Romi Park as Takashi
Takahiro Sakurai as Ryo
Toshiyuki Morikawa as Kisaragi
Tetsuya Kakihara as Taro
Takayuki Sugo as Captain Borg
Kenji Takahashi as Saga
Jiro Saito as Chairman Itakura
English
Colleen Clinkenbeard as Lt. Cdr. Vexille Serra
Travis Willingham as Cdr. Leon Fayden
Christine Auten as Maria
Christopher Sabat as Zack
Jason Douglas as Saito
Luci Christian as Takashi
Illich Guardiola as Ryo
J. Michael Tatum as Kisaragi
Todd Haberkorn as Taro
John Swasey as Captain Borg
Phil Parsons as Saga
Kent Williams as Chairman Itakura

Music
The original soundtrack and music to the series features an electronic, techno, urumee melam and trance theme, and features Basement Jaxx, Boom Boom Satellites, Asian Dub Foundation, Dead Can Dance, Carl Craig, The Prodigy, DJ Shadow, M.I.A, with singer Mink providing the theme song Together again and Paul Oakenfold handling the music score production, which was co-written with Ian Green and Michael J McEvoy. McEvoy also orchestrated and programmed the score.

Reception
This movie has been said to have a Resident Evil-like plotline and has drawn many comparisons to the movie. A review of the DVD on website IGN gave this film 6 out of 10, finding it difficult to follow and riddled with plot holes. They also found fault with the soundtrack, particularly Paul Oakenfold's score: "A couple of tracks manage to rise to the occasion, but for the most part, Vexille's tunes feel limp and repetitive." Hyper comments on the film for "retreading of familiar territory already covered effectively by Ghost in the Shell". It commends the visuals for its "cel-shading and rotoscoping, leading to some incredibly impressive looking set pieces". However, it criticises the action scenes which "aren't nearly as exciting as they should be — most of the action scenes boil down to rather mundane gun fights or chases, and while they look great there's no real energy in them." It currently has a 60% approval rating on Rotten Tomatoes.

Releases
For the Region 1 release Vexille was first released in a 1 disc format on May 20, 2008, followed by a 2 Disc special edition on November 4, 2008. Both versions include the original Japanese soundtrack as well as the English dub, with optional subtitles.

A Blu-ray Disc version was released on the same day as the 2 Disc special edition and includes exactly the same features as its DVD counterpart.

Region 2 DVD was released on September 1, 2008, in a limited edition steelbook 2 Disc set, featuring only the original Japanese soundtrack with English subtitles without English Dub. That version has since gone out of print and has been replaced by a standard 1 disc set with no extra features.

A Blu-ray Disc version is yet to be released on Region B.

Live-action film
Universal Studios has acquired the rights to the film to produce a live-action remake. Beau Flynn and Tripp Vinson have signed on as producers, Lisa Zambri as executive producer and Evan Spiliotopoulos as screenwriter.

See also
Appleseed

References

External links

 

Twitch Vexille review
Variety.com Vexille review
The Japan Times Vexille review

2007 anime films
2007 science fiction action films
2007 films
Anime with original screenplays
2007 computer-animated films
Cyberpunk anime and manga
Films directed by Fumihiko Sori
Funimation
Japanese computer-animated films
Japanese science fiction action films
Films set in 2067
Films set in 2077
Films set in the 2060s
Films set in the 2070s